The Malaysian Electronic Payment System (MEPS) is an interbank network service provider in Malaysia. In August 2017, MEPS merged with Malaysian Electronic Clearing Corporation Sdn Bhd (MyClear) to form Payments Network Malaysia Sdn Bhd (PayNet).

With the result of the merger, PayNet is now the holding company for the PayNet Group which comprises two main subsidiaries, namely Malaysian Electronic Payment System Sdn Bhd (MEPS) and MEPS Currency Management Sdn Bhd (MCM). The PayNet Group is Malaysia's premier payments network and central infrastructure for financial markets.

MEPS plays the integral role in the implementation of smart cards for automated teller machine (ATM) cards, which are an upgrade to chip-based cards from previous magnetic-stripe cards issued to all banks' customers.

The card is also known as Bankcard, a card with multiple functions. There are three main functions that can be used, namely ATM (with various combinations of banking transactions), e-debit (online purchase payment) transactions at participating merchants and MEPS Cash (a stored-value card that can be used to pay at participating merchants).

MEPS is a member of the Asian Payment Network (APN).

Role
In brief, MEPS’ role encompasses:
 Development and implementation of payment services
 Provision and management of shared infrastructure for participating financial institutions
 Operating e-payment clearing and settlement systems for the financial industry
 Governing adherence to relevant standards
 Developing technical standards and specifications for the Smart Card
 Certification services for payment smart card and personalisation centres

MEPS provide the following services through its network to all participating banks:
 Nationwide Shared ATM Network – An interbank switching infrastructure network for routine banking transactions including cash withdrawal, funds transfer, credit card and loan repayment, account balance inquiry, mobile prepaid top-up, MEPS CASH loading and Touch n’ Go top-up
 Cross-Border Initiative – A cross-border ATM network and link with six countries; providing inter-country cash withdrawal services and will be expanded to include inter-country funds transfer and balance enquiry
 Regional Switching for Financial Institutions – Provision of ATM switching services for member banks amongst their regional branches
 MEPS ATM – Deployment of white-label ATMs which are owned and managed by MEPS. The ATMs offer services ranging from domestic and cross-border cash withdrawal, domestic balance enquiry and funds transfer. Cardholders of participating banks in Malaysia have access to these ATMs while cash advance facilities for MasterCard and Visa cardholders would be enabled soon
 Payment Multi-Purpose Card Specification (PMPC) – A proprietary ATM and Debit chip-card standard which was developed by MEPS. MEPS is the central coordinating body for the national implementation of the PMPC and is responsible for developing the PMPC chip card specification, technical standards, technical integration, support and coordination. MEPS is upgrading the PMPC standard to become EMV compliant and renamed as Malaysian Chip Card Specification (MCCS).

Member banks
Listed below is the participating banks. However, some participating banks provide only selected few of the services offered by MEPS as mentioned above.

Affin Bank
Alliance Bank Malaysia Berhad
Al Rajhi Bank
Agrobank
AmBank
Bank Islam Malaysia
Bank Rakyat
Bank Muamalat Malaysia
Bank Simpanan Nasional
CIMB Bank
Citibank
Hong Leong Bank
HSBC Bank
Kuwait Finance House
Maybank
MBSB Bank
OCBC Bank
Public Bank
RHB Bank
Standard Chartered Bank
United Overseas Bank

Awards and recognition
MEPS is accredited with the following:
 ISO / IEC 27001 for Information Security Management System (ISMS)
 ISO 9001: 2008 Quality Management System
 MS 1900: 2005 Quality Management Systems – Requirements from Islamic Perspectives
 Malaysian Book of Records as First IT Company to be Certified from Islamic Perspectives
 Top Ten Favourite Brands by Superbrands Malaysia
 2015 Cards & Electronic Payments International (CEPI) Asia Payment Awards – Best Peer-to-Peer Payments Initiative (Highly Commended)

See also
ATM usage fees

References

External links 

https://www.paynet.my/
https://www.mepsatm.com.my/
 MEPS FAQ

Financial services companies established in 1997
Companies based in Kuala Lumpur
Interbank networks
1997 establishments in Malaysia
2017 mergers and acquisitions
Malaysian brands